The National Police Corps (CNP; ; also known simply as National Police) is the national civilian police force of Spain. The CNP is mainly responsible for policing urban areas, whilst rural policing is generally the responsibility of the Civil Guard, the Spanish national gendarmerie force. The CNP operates under the authority of Spain's Ministry of the Interior. They mostly handle criminal investigation, judicial, terrorism and immigration matters. The powers of the National Police Corps varies according to the autonomous communities. For example,  Ertzaintza in the Basque Country and Mossos d'Esquadra in Catalonia are the primary police agencies. In Navarra they share some duties jointly with Policía Foral (Foruzaingoa).

History
The 1986 organic law unifying the separate uniformed and plainclothes branches of the national police was a major reform that required a considerable period of time to be brought into full effect. The former plainclothes service, known as the Superior Police Corps, but often referred to as the "secret police", formerly the General Police Corps, consisted of some 9,000 officers. Prior to 1986, it had a supervisory and coordinating role in police operations, conducted domestic surveillance, collected intelligence, investigated major crimes, issued identity documents, and carried out liaison with foreign police forces.

The uniformed service, the Armed Police Corps which became the basis of the current National Police in 1978, was a completely separate organization with a complement of about 50,000 officers, including a small number of female recruits who were first accepted for training in 1984. The Director General of the National Police Corps, a senior official of the Ministry of Interior, commanded 13 regional headquarters, 50 provincial offices, and about 190 municipal police stations. In the nine largest cities, several district police stations served separate sections of the city. The chief of police of each station was in command of both the uniformed and the plainclothes officers attached to the station. A centrally controlled Special Operations Group was an elite fighting unit trained to deal with terrorist and hostage situations.

The principal weapons regularly used by the uniformed police were 9mm pistols, 9mm submachine guns, CETME and NATO 7.62mm rifles, and various forms of riot equipment. Their original uniform consisted of light brown trousers and dark brown jackets.

The initial training phase for recruits to the National Police Corps was nine months, followed by a year of practical training. Promotions to corporal, sergeant, and sergeant major were based on seniority, additional training, and performance. In the Franco era, most police officers were seconded from the Spanish Army (with some from the Civil Guard). Under a 1978 law, future police officers were to receive separate training, and army officers detailed to the police were to be permanently transferred. By 1986 only 170 army officers remained in the National Police Corps. Under the 1986 organic law, military-type training for police was to be terminated, and all candidate officers were to attend the Higher Police School at Ávila, which previously had served as the three-year training center for the Superior Police Corps. The ranks of the plainclothes corps—commissioners, subcommissioners, and inspectors of first, second, and third class—were to be assimilated into the ranking system of the uniformed police—colonel, lieutenant colonel, major, captain, and lieutenant. Two lower categories—subinspection and basic—would include all nonofficer uniformed personnel. The newly unified National Police Corps was to be responsible for issuing identity cards and passports, as well as for immigration and deportation controls, refugees, extradition, deportation, gambling controls, drugs, and supervision of private security forces.

Franco's Policía Armada had once been dreaded as one of the most familiar symbols of the regime's oppressiveness. During the 1980s, however, the police underwent an internal transformation process, being brought to adopt the new democratic spirit of the times. The police supported the legally constituted government during the 1981 coup attempt. Led by the new police trade union, the police demonstrated in 1985 against right-wing militants in their ranks and cooperated in efforts to punish misconduct and abuses of civil rights by individual officers.

The current sidearm is the Heckler & Koch USP Compact 9×19mm

Duties
Duties are regulated by the Organic law 2/1986 of March 13, 1986.
 The issuing of identity documents – National ID cards and passports.
 To control receipts and outgoings of the foreign people and Spaniards.
 Immigration law, refuge and asylum, extradition and expulsion.
 Gambling enforcement
 Drug enforcement
 Collaboration with Interpol and Europol.
 Control of private security companies
 General law enforcement and criminal investigation.

Access and training

Requirements
 Be born or a naturalized Spanish citizen
 Be over 18 years of age.
 Not have been convicted of fraud or dismissed by a local, regional or national government, or prevented from holding public functions.
 Hold a driving licence of the class specified by the government.
Basic Scale:
 Have or to be in conditions to obtain the Certificate of Bachillerato or equivalent.
Executive Scale:
 Have a Technical Engineer, Technical Architect, Qualified University student or equivalent or top formation degree.

Competitive examination
The applicant can choose between a Basic Scale career or an Executive Scale career. Applicants must pass the following basic tests before starting the academy:

 Physical test
 Multiple-choice exam
 Aptitude test
 Voluntary language test (English or French)
 Medical examination
 Interview

Training academy

If the applicant has been chosen, they will receive professional training at the police academy in Ávila for nine months. Whilst trainees reside at the academy, they learn about Spanish law, receive firearms and self-defense training, conduct practical application exercises, learn the basics of the English or French languages and undergo training in crime investigation. Finally, the pupil will receive a policing practice for a year, in which there will be various common situations that will form him as an agent.

Ranks

From 1979 to 1986 the Police sported a military rank system, a holdover of the old Armed Police.

Above the cadet ranks (there are five cadet ranks), the current ranks are:

 – Policeman/policewoman
 – Police Officer
 – Sub-inspector
 – Inspector
 – Chief Inspector
 – Commissioner
 – Principal Commissioner
 – Superior Chief
 – Commissioner General, and  – Divisional Chief [equal ranks]
 – Sub-Director General
 – Assistant Director of Operations
 – Director-General of Police

Rank insignia

Rank insignia 1986–2014

Uniforms

Specialist units
There are numerous specialist units within the CNP:
GOES – police tactical units.
GEO – elite police tactical unit, equivalent to GSG-9 or FBI HRT.
TEDAX-NRBQ – Explosive artifacts defuser and CRBN (Chemical, Radiological, Biological, and Nuclear) specialised team.
UIP – Anti-riot unit.
UPR – Anti-riot unit.
UDYCO – Drugs and organised crime investigation squad.
UDEV – Investigation and pursuit several kinds of crimes related to artistic and cultural heritage, families.
BIT – Computer crime unit.
UDEF – Financial crimes.
UEGC – Canine unit. Drug, explosives and people detection.
CGPJ – intelligence unit.
CGI – intelligence and anti-terrorism unit.
SMA.
USPA.
TEDAX
GOIT.
GOR.
Unidad Canina – Canine unit

Gallery

See also
 Law enforcement in Spain
 Crime in Spain

References

External links

Spanish police forces forum The most complete forum about different Spanish police forces.

National law enforcement agencies of Spain
Spain
Anti–child pornography organizations